The winners of the 1991–92 Asian Cup Winners' Cup, the association football competition run by the Asian Football Confederation, are listed below.

First round

West Asia

|}

East Asia

|}
1 Pupuk Kaltim entered as the Indonesian league runners-up for 1990, as the 1990/92 league had not yet finished. 
2 Sinugba were drawn against the South Korean representatives, but the South Korean FA did not send a team.

Second Round (West Asia)

|}

Quarterfinals

|}
1 Sinugba withdrew.

Semifinals

|}

Final
Al Nasr lost 5-0 was the record in the finals of the Asian Cup Winners' Cup

|}

1st Leg

2nd Leg

References
Asian Cup Winners Cup 1992

Asian Cup Winners' Cup
2
2